Frank Séchehaye (3 November 1907 – 13 February 1982) was a Swiss footballer (goalkeeper). He participated in the 1928 Summer Olympics and the 1934 FIFA World Cup. He played a total of 37 matches for Switzerland.

He played club football for Etoile-Carouge FC, Club Français, Servette FC and FC Lausanne-Sport. He coached Forward Morges, FC Lausanne-Sport, Servette FC and FC Sion.

References

External links

1907 births
1982 deaths
Swiss men's footballers
Switzerland international footballers
Footballers at the 1928 Summer Olympics
Olympic footballers of Switzerland
1934 FIFA World Cup players
Servette FC players
FC Lausanne-Sport players
Swiss football managers
FC Lausanne-Sport managers
Servette FC managers
FC Sion managers
Club Français players
Association football goalkeepers
Footballers from Geneva